Charbel or Sharbel may refer to:

Religion 
 Maronite Catholic Eparchy of Saint Charbel in Buenos Aires, named after St. Charbel Makhlouf
 Acts of Sharbel, a Syriac Christian martyrdom text

People

Mononym
 Charbel (martyr) (died 107 AD), Christian martyr

Surname
 Marwan Charbel (born 1947), Lebanese brigadier general and minister

Given name
 Charbel Dagher, Lebanese literature professor, poet and journalist
 Charbel Farhat, Lebanese-American engineering professor
 Charbel Georges, Swedish footballer
 Charbel Georges Merhi (born 1937), an eparch of the Maronite Catholic Eparchy of San Charbel in Buenos Aires
 Charbel Iskandar, Lebanese actor
 Charbel Makhlouf (1828–1898), Lebanese Maronite monk and saint
 Charbel Nader, Australian investment banker
 Charbel Nahas, Lebanese politician and minister
 Charbel Rouhana, Lebanese oud player 
 Sarbel, Greek-British pop singer of Greek-Cypriot & Lebanese ancestry
 Sharbel Touma, Lebanon-born Swedish footballer

Masculine given names
Aramaic languages